Euphorbia obesa is a subtropical succulent species of flowering plant in the genus Euphorbia. It comes from South Africa, especially the Cape Province. Sometimes referred to as the baseball plant.

In the wild it is endangered because of over-collection and poaching, combined with its slow growth, and the fact that the pod contains only 2 to 3 seeds. However, it is widely cultivated in botanical gardens.

Description
Euphorbia obesa resembles a ball, thornless and decorative. It is commonly known as 'baseball plant' due to its shape.
Its diameter is between 6 cm and 15 cm depending on its age.
Young plants are spherical, but become cylindrical with age. They contain water reservoirs for periods of drought.

It almost always shows 8 ridges adorned with small deep gibbosity regularly planted on the edges. 
It is green with horizontal lighter or darker stripes. In the wild, and with exposure to direct sunlight, it shows red and purple areas.

The plant is dioecious, which means that a subject has only male or female flowers. The small flowers are insignificant in apex. In fact, like all Euphorbia, flowers are called cyathia.

As in all Euphorbia species, the latex is toxic.

Living in similar conditions on two different continents, Euphorbia obesa presents a form of convergence with Astrophytum asterias which is a cactus from Mexico.

Cultivation
In cultivation in the UK, Euphorbia obesa has won the Royal Horticultural Society's Award of Garden Merit.

References

External links

obesa
Endemic flora of South Africa
obesa
Garden plants of Africa
Dioecious plants
Taxa named by Joseph Dalton Hooker